The Mitsubishi Electric Championship at Hualalai is a golf tournament on the PGA Tour Champions in Hawaii, on the Big Island. It is played annually in January at the Hualalai Resort Golf Club in Kaūpūlehu in the Kona district, and Mitsubishi Electric is the main sponsor. The field consists of the senior major champions of the last five years and other tournament winners of the last two years, plus a few sponsor invitees.

The purse in 2020 was $1.8 million, with a winner's share of $305,000.

The tournament debuted  in 1984 as the senior division within the PGA Tour's MONY Tournament of Champions at LaCosta Resort in Carlsbad, California. The purse was $100,000 and Orville Moody won by seven strokes to take the winner's share of $30,000. It continued as a division of that tournament through 1994, became a separate event in Puerto Rico in 1995, and relocated to Hualalai in 1997.

Beginning in 2018, the tournament went to a Thursday through Saturday schedule.

Winners

Multiple winners
Eight players have won this tournament more than once through 2022.

3 wins
Bernhard Langer: 2009, 2014, 2017
Miguel Ángel Jiménez: 2015, 2020, 2022
2 wins
John Cook: 2011, 2013
Hale Irwin: 1997, 2007
Dana Quigley: 2003, 2005
George Archer: 1990, 2000
Al Geiberger: 1992, 1993 (consecutive)
Miller Barber: 1986, 1989

Notes

References

External links
Coverage on the PGA Tour Champions's official site
Hualalai Resort – golf

PGA Tour Champions events
Golf in Hawaii
Golf in California
Recurring sporting events established in 1984
1984 establishments in California